Coleophora succursella is a moth of the family Coleophoridae. It is found from Fennoscandia to the Pyrenees and Italy and from France to Poland and Slovakia.

The larvae feed on Achillea millefolium, Artemisia absinthium, Artemisia campestris and Artemisia vulgaris. They create a tubular silken case. The anterior part is covered with a short, erect, whitish felt, while the rear end is hairless, quickly tapering, with a few dark length lines and trivalved. The case is 10–12 mm long. The mouth angle is 40-45°. Larvae can be found from October to June.

References

succursella
Moths of Europe
Moths described in 1855